Matti Allan Ahde (23 December 1945 – 20 December 2019) was a Finnish politician from the Social Democratic Party.

Ahde was born in Oulu. He was a member of the parliament from 1970 to 1990, when he left to become CEO of the state monopoly Veikkaus. Ahde held minister posts in Sorsa's cabinets 1982–1987 and was elected Speaker of the Parliament in 1987. He was replaced as the speaker by Kalevi Sorsa in 1989 when Sorsa stepped down from Holkeri's cabinet to make the position available for party chairman Pertti Paasio. 

Ahde quit as CEO of Veikkaus in 2001 and was re-elected to the parliament in 2003.

On 20 December 2019, Ahde died of pancreatic cancer at his home in Helsinki, Finland.

References 

1945 births
2019 deaths
Deaths from cancer in Finland
Deaths from pancreatic cancer
People from Oulu
Social Democratic Party of Finland politicians
Ministers of the Interior of Finland
Minister of the Environment of Finland
Speakers of the Parliament of Finland
Members of the Parliament of Finland (1970–72)
Members of the Parliament of Finland (1972–75)
Members of the Parliament of Finland (1975–79)
Members of the Parliament of Finland (1979–83)
Members of the Parliament of Finland (1983–87)
Members of the Parliament of Finland (1987–91)
Members of the Parliament of Finland (2003–07)
Members of the Parliament of Finland (2007–11)